"Toch-v-Toch" (Russian: "Точь-в-точь", "Right to a Tee") is a TV program on Russia's Channel One and the unofficial sequel to the show "Odin v odin!" (the Russian version of the international format "Your Face Sounds Familiar" by "Endemol").

Like its predecessor, "Odin v odin!", "Toch-v-toch" also involves celebrities trying to impersonate well-known musicians, singers and actors, trying to appear as similar as possible. Four jury members and an arbitrator rank the performances, with the winner being the contestant to amass the most points throughout the season.

The show's host is actor and TV presenter Alexander Oleshko.

Format 
The show's contestants are singers and actors. In each episode, they need to impersonate a famous musician or actor by performing a song from said celebrity's repertoire, while dressed as them and trying to recreate the way they move, talk and sing. The jury, consisting of four people and an arbitrator, gives the contestants marks for their performances between 1 and 5, so the maximum number of points a person can receive in one episode is 25.

The number of contestants differs from one season to another. The first two seasons, as well as the fourth one, had 12 contestants; the third season had 13 participants; while the fifth season has only ten. While in "Your Face Sounds Familiar" the jury members know in advance who the contestants are, this is not the case with "Toch-v-toch". In the first episode the jury members have to try to guess the people behind the costumes, while in every consecutive episode the contestants are known already, but still are not announced, and the jury has to guess whose performance they have just watched, while already knowing who the possible contestants are.

Judges 
The main jury of the project consists of four people. The only permanent jury member in all five seasons is actor Leonid Yarmolnik. Actor and comedian Gennady Khazanov and opera singer Lyubov Kazarnovskaya were permanent jury members in the first four seasons of the show, while in the fifth season the new permanent jury members are actor Maksim Averin and comedian and season three winner Maksim Galkin.

Each jury member gives a mark to each contestant after they have performed, rating their impersonation from 1 to 5. At the end of the episode, a fifth jury member - the arbitrator, appears, usually also dressed as a famous singer or actor, and also performing a number as that celebrity, before giving his marks to the contestants (also from 1 to 5). The arbitrator is different in each episode, and watches the show from a separate room.

Series overview

Season 1 (2014)

Results
The following chart contains the names of the iconic singers that the celebrities imitated every week.

 Highest scoring performance and encore
 Highest scoring performance
 Lowest scoring performance
 Prize from TV Viewer

Season 2 (2015)

Results
The following chart contains the names of the iconic singers that the celebrities imitated every week.

 Highest scoring performance and encore
 Highest scoring performance
 Lowest scoring performance
 Prize from TV Viewer
 Prize from Jury

Season 3 (2015)

Results
The following chart contains the names of the iconic singers that the celebrities imitated every week.

 Highest scoring performance and encore
 Highest scoring performance
 Lowest scoring performance
 Prize from TV Viewer
 Prize from Jury

Season 4 (2016)

Results
The following chart contains the names of the iconic singers that the celebrities imitated every week.

 Highest scoring performance and encore
 Highest scoring performance
 Lowest scoring performance
 Prize from TV Viewer
 Prize from Jury

Season 5 (2021)

Results
The following chart contains the names of the iconic singers that the celebrities imitated every week.

 Highest scoring performance and encore
 Highest scoring performance
 Lowest scoring performance
 Prize from TV Viewer and Jury

Notes

Russian music television series
2014 Russian television series debuts